Marie-Elizabeth Cléry (or Mme Duverge-Cléry) née Du Verger or Du Verge (b. 1761, d. after 1795) was a French harpist and composer. She was probably born in Paris and became a harpist in the court of Marie-Antoinette. After her marriage to Jean-Baptiste Cant-Hanet dit Cléry, she published three sonatas for harp accompanied by violin, Trois Sonates pour La Harpe ou Piano-forte avec Accompagnement de Violon (1785).

Works
3 Sonates pour la harpe ou pianoforte, with violin accompaniment; edited by Barbara Garvey Jackson. ClarNan Editions, Arkansas, c. 1988. Sonata 1 in C major, Sonata 2 in E♭ major, Sonata 3 in B♭ major

References

External links
 

1761 births
Year of death uncertain
18th-century classical composers
French classical composers
French women classical composers
French classical harpists
18th-century French composers
18th-century women composers